Rogelio Weatherbee (born 8 July 1955) is a Mexican weightlifter. He competed in the men's middleweight event at the 1980 Summer Olympics.

Major results

References

1955 births
Living people
Mexican male weightlifters
Olympic weightlifters of Mexico
Weightlifters at the 1980 Summer Olympics
Place of birth missing (living people)
Pan American Games medalists in weightlifting
Pan American Games bronze medalists for Mexico
Weightlifters at the 1979 Pan American Games
20th-century Mexican people
21st-century Mexican people